Meyers House may refer to:

 Elias Meyers House, Petoskey, Michigan
 Olcovich–Meyers House, Carson City, Nevada
 Meyers House (Hillsboro, New Mexico), in Hillsboro, New Mexico
 Capt. Meyers House, Vermilion, Ohio, listed on the NRHP in Erie County, Ohio

See also
Meyer House (disambiguation)
Myer House (disambiguation)
Myers House (disambiguation)